Csaba Szucs may refer to:

 Csaba Szűcs (born 1965), Hungarian long-distance runner
 Csaba Szücs (born 1987), Slovak handball player